The Professionals' Academy of Commerce (PAC) is an accountancy and commerce educational institution in Pakistan. The college was established in 1987 and has branches in five cities of Pakistan along with an online teaching portal. PAC also has a publishing wing, Ishfaq Publishing Company, named after its founder Mr. Ishfaq Ahmed FCA (late).

History

PAC Established 1987 
The history of PAC began in the drawing room of Mr. Ishfaq Ahmed, the founder of PAC. He started by teaching two students in his drawing room. Realizing the dearth of quality institutes in the field of Accountancy, he established PAC in 1987. Mr. Ishfaq Ahmed aimed to revolutionize the field of accountancy by introducing innovative teaching methods such as using audio and visual aids in class; holding regular group discussions with his students; conducting weekly quizzes and presenting practical bookkeeping. By late 90s, PAC had solidified its name as the premiere accountancy institute in the country.

First gold medal 1992 
The decision of Mr. Ishfaq Ahmed bore fruit when PAC secured its first gold medal through its student Mr. Ali Zeb. It was an assurance that PAC was headed in the right direction. With the continuous commitment of the faculty and staff alike, PAC continued on its successful journey from one milestone to another achieving many accolades and distinctions on the way.

Occasions 
There are different occasions and events in PAC held annually. Which includes Annual Sports Day, Founder's Day and many others.

Founder's Day 
July 4 is a Founder's Day in PAC, a death anniversary of its founder Mr. Ishfaq Ahmed commemorated by PAC annually. On this day awards are distributed among the position holder students and among the outstanding teachers. Principal addressed to the students every year.

Courses 
Courses being taught at PAC include:
 Chartered Accountancy (ICAP)
 ACCA
 CFA

Campuses 
PAC campuses are:
 PAC Gulberg Lahore:
 Central: 41 – T, Gulberg II, Gurumangat Road, Lahore
 Garden Town: 14, Aurangzeb Block Garden Town, Lahore
 PAC Islamabad: Main Kashmir Highway, Near، G-14/1 G-14, Islamabad
 PAC Rawalpindi
 PAC Peshawar: 4 D, Park Avenue، Road, University Town, Peshawar, Khyber Pakhtunkhwa
 PAC Sialkot: 10-B, Model Town, Khadim Ali Road, Sialkot
 PAC School of Online Learning

Facts and Figures 
 PAC has 39+ Gold Medals, 144+ Certificates of Merit and 106 other Worldwide & Nationwide Distinctions
 PAC School of Online Learning
 Years in operations >33 
 Services Offered CA, ACCA, CFA and VARIOUS TRAINING PROGRAMS
 of National and International campuses 7
 Built-up campus area 80,000 Sq. ft
 Existing number of students more than 5,000
 Scholarships distributed 2M+
 Faculty members 200+
 Permanent employees 200+
 Alumni 0.1 million+
 Societies & Clubs affiliation 10
 Books Published by Own publisher 100+ Publications.
 First ever institute in Accountancy in Pakistan Issuing College Magazine regularly named Al-Haseeb for the students since 1998.
 FBR Trained officers 1,200+

See also 
 SKANS
 Rise

References

External links 
 PAC official site

Accounting schools in Pakistan
Universities and colleges in Lahore